OGS may refer to:

Science & technology
 Optical Ground Station, European Space Agency's ground based observatory on Tenerife, Spain
 Oklahoma Geological Survey
 Ontario Genealogical Society
 Ontario Geological Survey

Technology
 OGS (electronic toll collection), used on toll roads and bridges in Turkey
 One Glass Solution, touchscreen technology

Others
 Ogdensburg International Airport, New York
 Ole Gunnar Solskjær, former Norwegian footballer and current football manager
 Online-Go Server, a non-Java server for Go
 Ontario Graduate Scholarship, in Canada
 Oratory of the Good Shepherd, an international community within the Anglican Communion
 , sign language used by the Austrian Deaf community